Christopher Mayer (born Christopher Plummer; 1961) is an Australian actor known for his work on the sitcom Hey Dad..!.

Personal life 

Mayer was born in Trinidad and Tobago.
 
He is now married to Nicole Smith and has two children.

Career 

Mayer starred in the Australian sitcom Hey Dad..!.  His other TV appearances include: Home and Away, Underbelly 3, Good Guys Bad Guys, Neighbours and the TV Mini-Series My Brother Tom. He also appeared as Oliver Mellors in the open-air production of Lady Chatterley's Lover directed by Australian film and theatre director Robert Chuter for Foster Grace Productions in 1999 at Tranby House, Maylands, Perth. 

Mayer underwent a career change after leaving Hey Dad..!, and became a location manager in Sydney, Australia.  
 
He is the founder and director of two businesses, Australian Film Locations and modelling and casting agency RoughCast.

External links
 
Property Council article (01/08/2005) – Lights, Camera, Action
 Australian Film Locations
 

1961 births
Living people
Australian male television actors
Male actors from Sydney